Charles Alexander Legge (born August 24, 1930) is a former United States district judge of the United States District Court for the Northern District of California.

Education and career
Legge was born in San Francisco, California and attended Piedmont High School. He received an Artium Baccalaureus degree from Stanford University in 1952 and a Juris Doctor from Stanford Law School in 1954. He passed the State Bar of California in 1954. He was in the United States Army from 1954 to 1956, and was then in private practice in San Francisco until 1984.

Federal judicial service
On June 19, 1984, Legge was nominated by President Ronald Reagan to a seat on the United States District Court for the Northern District of California vacated by Judge Robert Howard Schnacke. Legge was confirmed by the United States Senate on September 17, 1984, and received his commission on September 18, 1984. Legge served in that capacity until his retirement, on June 30, 2001.

Post judicial service
Following his retirement from the bench, Legge engaged in the private practice of law, concentrating in the areas of arbitration, mediation and intellectual property. He is now fully retired.

References

Sources

1930 births
Living people
20th-century American judges
Judges of the United States District Court for the Northern District of California
United States district court judges appointed by Ronald Reagan
Stanford Law School alumni
United States Army soldiers